Mark Frost (born 1953) is an American screenwriter, producer and director.

Mark Frost may also refer to:

 Mark Frost (actor), English actor
 Mark Frost (cricketer) (born 1962), English cricketer
 Mark Frost (darts player) (born 1971), English darts player